William Duncan Schuette (born October 13, 1953) is an American lawyer and politician who served as the 53rd attorney general of Michigan from 2011 to 2019. He was the unsuccessful Republican nominee for Senate in 1990 and for Governor of Michigan in the 2018 gubernatorial election.

Early life
Schuette was born in Midland, Michigan. He is the son of Esther Cathrin (Little) and William H. Schuette, and step-son of Carl Gerstacker, former chairman of the board of The Dow Chemical Company. Schuette graduated from Herbert Henry Dow High School in 1972. He attended Georgetown University in Washington, D.C. and in 1976 graduated cum laude with a Bachelor of Science degree in the Foreign Service. He also studied at the University of Aberdeen in Scotland and received a J.D. from the University of San Francisco School of Law in 1979. Schuette was admitted to the Michigan bar in 1981.

Political career

Schuette was a delegate to the Michigan Republican conventions in 1972, 1974, and 1982.

In November 1984, at the age of 31, Schuette narrowly defeated incumbent Democrat Donald J. Albosta for a seat in the United States House of Representatives from Michigan's 10th congressional district. Schuette was re-elected to the two succeeding Congresses, serving from January 3, 1985 until January 3, 1991. In 1990, he unsuccessfully challenged Democratic United States Senator Carl Levin for reelection. While in Congress, Schuette served on the House Budget Committee, the House Agriculture Committee and the House Select Committee on Aging.

In January 1991, Schuette was named by then-Governor John Engler as the director of the Michigan Department of Agriculture. The incumbent director, Robert Mitchell, resigned after Engler was elected governor. He was approved by the five member agriculture commission on January 11, 1991. While director, Schuette and his wife Cynthia created the Michigan Harvest Gathering, a food and fund drive to help feed hungry people throughout the state. Joining with the Food Bank Council of Michigan, the Michigan Harvest Gathering has raised more than $4 million and 6 million pounds of food over a 12-year period. He resigned from his post on February 25, 1994 to run for the Michigan State Senate. He was replaced by Gordon Guyer as director of agriculture.

In November 1994, he was elected to the Michigan Senate from the 35th district, where he served until 2003. In 2001, Schuette was selected by President George W. Bush to be his personal representative to Australian-American Friendship Week in Australia.

In November 2002, he was elected a judge on the Michigan Fourth District Court of Appeals. He succeeded Donald E. Holbrook Jr. He took office in January 2003. His term expired on January 1, 2009. He was replaced by Michael J. Kelly.

In 2008, Michigan voters considered a ballot initiative to establish a medical marijuana program for registered patients with qualifying conditions. Schuette served as a spokesperson for a group opposed to the proposed law.
After leaving the judiciary, Schuette worked for Warner, Norcross & Judd, one of Michigan's largest law firms.

On November 2, 2010, Schuette won the election to become Michigan Attorney General.

In September 2011, petition language to recall Schuette was approved by Midland County authorities, allowing the circulating of recall petitions. Among the grievances cited are his attempts to undermine the medical marijuana law approved by voters in 2008.

In 2011, Schuette filed suit to close two Michigan abortion clinics on grounds of improper record disposal.

Before the Supreme Court's 2015, decision in Obergefell v. Hodges, Schuette fought against same-sex marriage.

On August 19, 2015, Schuette endorsed Jeb Bush for president.

In December 2016, Schuette filed suit to try to stop a presidential election recount effort in Michigan requested by Green Party candidate Jill Stein.

In January 2017, Schuette was admonished by Eastern District of United States of Michigan Judge David M. Lawson for attempting to file an amicus brief taking an opposite position than Schuette originally took on the issue of requiring the State of Michigan to supply bottled water to Flint residents who lack tap filters. Judge Lawson said it injected a "troubling ethical issue into [the] lawsuit" and it suggested "superficial posturing" on behalf of Schuette.

Schuette chose not to challenge incumbent Dan Kildee for his congressional seat in the redrawn district which includes Schuette's home of Midland in the 2022 midterm election.

2018 gubernatorial campaign

Schuette was widely believed to be planning to run for governor of Michigan. In July 2016, before speaking on the opening day of the 2016 Republican National Convention Schuette changed the name of his fundraising committee from "Bill Schuette for Attorney General" to "Bill Schuette for Michigan." Despite being ineligible for a further term as Attorney General due to term-limits, Schuette had continued to raise funds since his November 2014 re-election.

In December 2016, Schuette said he had not made up his mind on running for governor but would make a decision sometime in 2017. This is backed up by reports of a falling out between the Attorney General and Governor Rick Snyder.

On September 12, 2017, Schuette announced his campaign for governor in Midland, Michigan. On August 7, 2018, Schuette won the Republican nomination for Michigan governor by defeating Lieutenant Governor Brian Calley and state Senator Patrick Colbeck. His candidacy was supported by President Donald Trump and Vice President Mike Pence. On November 6, 2018, he lost the general election to Democrat Gretchen Whitmer, a former Michigan senate leader, by a nine-point margin.

Personal life
Schuette lives in Midland, Michigan with his wife Cynthia. They have two children. One of Schuette's children, Bill G. Schuette was elected to the Michigan House of Representatives in 2022.

Controversy
On July 3, 2018, Ingham County prosecutor Carol Siemon requested a grand jury investigation (which was never conducted) to probe the sale of multimillion-dollar property inherited by Schuette in the Virgin Islands, to determine if any laws were violated. Schuette's spokesperson stated that the accusation was a "baseless attack on an attorney general with a strong ethical record".

Schuette was working to strike down a ballot initiative to eliminate partisan gerrymandering, which has gained enough signatures to be on the Michigan ballot in the November 2018 election. The issue went on to the state supreme court, where "Five of the seven justices were nominated or appointed by Republicans, and two of those have received financial backing from the Michigan Chamber of Commerce, which also happens to be one of the main funders of the opposition campaign. Both justices have refused to recuse themselves from the case." The court upheld the inclusion of the initiative on the ballot which was approved by voters.

Electoral history

References

General

The Political Graveyard
Fourth District Judges

Citations

External links

Campaign website
Project Vote Smart – Bill Schuette profile
Our Campaigns – Bill Schuette profile

|-

|-

|-

|-

|-

|-

|-

|-

1953 births
20th-century American politicians
21st-century American politicians
American people of Dutch descent
Walsh School of Foreign Service alumni
Georgetown University alumni
Living people
Michigan Attorneys General
Michigan Court of Appeals judges
Michigan lawyers
Republican Party Michigan state senators
People from Midland, Michigan
Republican Party members of the United States House of Representatives from Michigan
State cabinet secretaries of Michigan
University of San Francisco School of Law alumni
Candidates in the 2018 United States elections